Burning/Filament/Rockets is the second album by Pelt, released in 1995 through Econogold Records.

Track listing

Personnel 
Pelt
Patrick Best – instruments
Mike Gangloff – vocals, instruments
Jack Rose – instruments

References 

1995 albums
Pelt (band) albums